Cannabis use disorder (CUD), also known as cannabis addiction or marijuana addiction, is defined in the fifth revision of the Diagnostic and Statistical Manual of Mental Disorders (DSM-5) and ICD-10 as the continued use of cannabis despite clinically significant impairment.

Signs and symptoms 
Cannabis use is associated with comorbid mental health problems, such as mood and anxiety disorders, and discontinuing cannabis use is difficult for some users. Psychiatric comorbidities are often present in dependent cannabis users including a range of personality disorders.

Based on annual survey data, some high school seniors who report smoking daily (nearly 7%, according to one study) may function at a lower rate in school than students that do not. The sedating and anxiolytic properties of tetrahydrocannabinol (THC) in some users might make the use of cannabis an attempt to self-medicate personality or psychiatric disorders.

Dependency
Prolonged cannabis use produces both pharmacokinetic changes (how the drug is absorbed, distributed, metabolized, and excreted) and pharmacodynamic changes (how the drug interacts with target cells) to the body. These changes require the user to consume higher doses of the drug to achieve a common desirable effect (known as a higher tolerance), reinforcing the body's metabolic systems for eliminating the drug more efficiently and further down-regulating cannabinoid receptors in the brain.

Cannabis users have shown decreased reactivity to dopamine, suggesting a possible link to a dampening of the reward system of the brain and an increase in negative emotion and addiction severity.

Cannabis users can develop tolerance to the effects of THC. Tolerance to the behavioral and psychological effects of THC has been demonstrated in adolescent humans and animals. The mechanisms that create this tolerance to THC are thought to involve changes in cannabinoid receptor function.

One study has shown that between 2001–2002 and 2012–2013, the use of marijuana in the US doubled.

Cannabis dependence develops in about 9% of users, significantly less than that of heroin, cocaine, alcohol, and prescribed anxiolytics, but slightly higher than that for psilocybin, mescaline, or LSD. Of those who use cannabis daily, 10–20% develop dependence.

Withdrawal
Cannabis withdrawal symptoms occur in half of people being treated for cannabis use disorders. Symptoms may include dysphoria, anxiety, irritability, depression, restlessness, disturbed sleep, gastrointestinal symptoms, and decreased appetite. It is often paired with rhythmic movement disorder. Most symptoms begin during the first week of abstinence and resolve after a few weeks. About 12% of heavy cannabis users showed cannabis withdrawal as defined by the DSM-5, and this was associated with significant disability as well as mood, anxiety and personality disorders.

Cause 
Cannabis addiction is often due to prolonged and increasing use of the drug. Increasing the strength of the cannabis taken and an increasing use of more effective methods of delivery often increase the progression of cannabis dependency. It can also be caused by being prone to becoming addicted to substances, which can be genetically or environmentally acquired.

Risk factors 
Certain factors are considered to heighten the risk of developing cannabis dependence. Longitudinal studies over a number of years have enabled researchers to track aspects of social and psychological development concurrently with cannabis use. Increasing evidence is being shown for the elevation of associated problems by the frequency and age at which cannabis is used, with young and frequent users being at most risk.

The main factors in Australia, for example, related to a heightened risk for developing problems with cannabis use include frequent use at a young age; personal maladjustment; emotional distress; poor parenting; school drop-out; affiliation with drug-using peers; moving away from home at an early age; daily cigarette smoking; and ready access to cannabis. The researchers concluded there is emerging evidence that positive experiences to early cannabis use are a significant predictor of late dependence and that genetic predisposition plays a role in the development of problematic use.

High risk groups 
A number of groups have been identified as being at greater risk of developing cannabis dependence and, in Australia, for example, have been found to include adolescent populations, Aboriginal and Torres Strait Islanders and people with mental health conditions.

Adolescents 
The endocannabinoid system is directly involved in adolescent brain development. Adolescent cannabis users are therefore particularly vulnerable to the potential adverse effects of cannabis use. Adolescent cannabis use is associated with increased cannabis misuse as an adult, issues with memory and concentration, long-term cognitive complications, and poor psychiatric outcomes including social anxiety, suicidality and addiction.

There are several reasons why adolescents start a smoking habit. According to a study completed by Bill Sanders, influence from friends, difficult household problems, and experimentation are some of the reasons why this population starts to smoke marijuana. This segment of population seems to be one of the most influenceable group there is. They want to follow the group and look "cool", "hip" and accepted by their friends. This fear of rejection plays a big role in their decision to use marijuana. However it does not seem to be the most important factor. According to a study from Canada, the lack of knowledge about cannabis seems to be the main reason why adolescents start to smoke. The authors observed a high correlation between adolescents that knew about the mental and physical harms of cannabis and their consumption. Of the 1045 young participants in the study, those who could name the least number of negative effects about this drug were usually the ones who were consuming it. They were not isolated cases either. Actually, the study showed that the proportion of teenagers who saw cannabis as a high-risk drug and the ones who thought the contrary was about the same.

Pregnancy 
There is an association between smoking cannabis during pregnancy and low birth weight. Smoking cannabis during pregnancy can lower the amount of oxygen delivered to the developing fetus, which can restrict fetal growth. The active ingredient in cannabis (D9-tetrahydrocannabinol, THC) is fat soluble and can enter into breastmilk during lactation. THC in breastmilk can then subsequently be taken up by a breastfeeding infant, as shown by the presence of THC in the infant's feces. However, the evidence for long-term effects of exposure to THC through breastmilk is unclear.

Diagnosis 
Cannabis use disorder is recognized in the fifth version of the Diagnostic and Statistical Manual of Mental Disorders (DSM-5), which also added cannabis withdrawal as a new condition.

In the 2013 revision for the DSM-5, DSM-IV abuse and dependence were combined into cannabis use disorder. The legal problems criterion (from cannabis abuse) has been removed, and the craving criterion was newly added, resulting in a total of eleven criteria: hazardous use, social/interpersonal problems, neglected major roles, withdrawal, tolerance, used larger amounts/longer, repeated attempts to quit/control use, much time spent using, physical/psychological problems related to use, activities given up and craving. For a diagnosis of DSM-5 cannabis use disorder, at least two of these criteria need to be present in the last twelve-month period. Additionally, three severity levels have been defined: mild (two or three criteria), moderate (four or five criteria) and severe (six or more criteria) cannabis use disorder.

Cannabis use disorder is also recognized in the eleventh revision of the International Classification of Diseases (ICD-11), adding more subdivisions including time intervals of pattern of use (episodic, continuous, or unspecified) and dependence (current, early full remission, sustained partial remission, sustained full remission, or unspecified) compared to the 10th revision.

A 2019 meta-analysis found that 34% of people with cannabis-induced psychosis transitioned to schizophrenia. This was found to be comparatively higher than hallucinogens (26%) and amphetamines (22%).

To screen for cannabis-related problems, several methods are used. Scales specific to cannabis, which provides the benefit of being cost efficient compared to extensive diagnostic interviews, include the Cannabis Abuse Screening Test (CAST), Cannabis Use Identification Test (CUDIT), and Cannabis Use Problems Identification Test (CUPIT). Scales for general drug use disorders are also used, including the Severity Dependence Scale (SDS), Drug Use Disorder Identification Test (DUDIT), and Alcohol, Smoking, and Substance Involvement Screening Test (ASSIST). However, there are no gold standard and both older and newer scales are still in use. To quantify cannabis use, methods such as Timeline Follow-Back (TLFB) and Cannabis Use Daily (CUD) are used. These methods measure general consumption and not grams of psychoactive substance as the concentration of THC may vary among drug users.

Treatment
Clinicians differentiate between casual users who have difficulty with drug screens, and daily heavy users, to a chronic user who uses multiple times a day. In the US, cannabis is the most commonly identified illicit substance used by people admitted to treatment facilities. Demand for treatment for cannabis use disorder increased internationally between 1995 and 2002. In the United States, the average adult who seeks treatment has consumed cannabis for over 10 years almost daily and has attempted to quit six or more times.

Treatment options for cannabis dependence are far fewer than for opiate or alcohol dependence. Most treatment falls into the categories of psychological or psychotherapeutic, intervention, pharmacological intervention or treatment through peer support and environmental approaches. No medications have been found effective for cannabis dependence, but psychotherapeutic models hold promise. Screening and brief intervention sessions can be given in a variety of settings, particularly at doctor's offices, which is of importance as most cannabis users seeking help will do so from their general practitioner rather than a drug treatment service agency.

The most commonly accessed forms of treatment in Australia are 12-step programmes, physicians, rehabilitation programmes, and detox services, with inpatient and outpatient services equally accessed. In the EU approximately 20% of all primary admissions and 29% of all new drug clients in 2005, had primary cannabis problems. And in all countries that reported data between 1999 and 2005 the number of people seeking treatment for cannabis use increased.

Psychological 
Psychological intervention includes cognitive behavioral therapy (CBT), motivational enhancement therapy (MET), contingency management (CM), supportive-expressive psychotherapy (SEP), family and systems interventions, and twelve-step programs.

Evaluations of Marijuana Anonymous programs, modelled on the 12-step lines of Alcoholics Anonymous and Narcotics Anonymous, have shown small beneficial effects for general drug use reduction. In 2006, the Wisconsin Initiative to Promote Healthy Lifestyles implemented a program that helps primary care physicians identify and address marijuana use problems in patients.

Medication 
As of 2020, there is no single medication that has been proven effective for treating cannabis use disorder; research is focused on three treatment approaches: agonist substitution, antagonist, and modulation of other neurotransmitter systems. More broadly, the goal of medication therapy for cannabis use disorder centers around targeting the stages of the addiction: acute intoxication/binge, withdrawal/negative affect, and preoccupation/anticipation.

For the treatment of the withdrawal/negative affect symptom domain of cannabis use disorder, medications may work by alleviating restlessness, irritable or depressed mood, anxiety, and insomnia. Bupropion, which is a norepinephrine–dopamine reuptake inhibitor, has been studied for the treatment of withdrawal with largely poor results. Atomoxetine has also shown poor results, and is as a norepinephrine reuptake inhibitor, though it does increase the release of dopamine through downstream effects in the prefrontal cortex (an area of the brain responsible for planning complex tasks and behavior). Venlafaxine, a serotonin–norepinephrine reuptake inhibitor, has also been studied for cannabis use disorder, with the thought that the serotonergic component may be useful for the depressed mood or anxious dimensions of the withdrawal symptom domain. While venlafaxine has been shown to improve mood for people with cannabis use disorder, a clinical trial in this population actually found worse cannabis abstinence rates compared to placebo. It is worth noting that venlafaxine is sometimes poorly tolerated, and infrequent use or abrupt discontinuation of its use can lead to withdrawal symptoms from the medication itself, including irritability, dysphoria, and insomnia. It is possible that venlafaxine use actually exacerbated cannabis withdrawal symptoms, leading people to use more cannabis than placebo to alleviate their discomfort. Mirtazapine, which increases serotonin and norepinephrine, has also failed to improve abstinence rates in people with cannabis use disorder.

People sometimes use cannabis to cope with their anxiety, and cannabis withdrawal can lead to symptoms of anxiety. Buspirone, a serotonin 1A receptor (5-HT1A) agonist, has shown limited efficacy for treating anxiety in people with cannabis use disorder, though there may be better efficacy in males than in females. Fluoxetine, a selective serotonin reuptake inhibitor, has failed to show efficacy in adolescents with both cannabis use disorder and depression. SSRIs are a class of antidepressant drugs that are also used for the treatment of anxiety disorders, such as generalized anxiety disorder. Vilazodone, which has both SSRI and 5-HT1A agonism properties, also failed to increase abstinence rates in people with cannabis use disorder.

Studies of divalproex have found no significant benefit, though some studies have found mixed results. Baclofen, a GABA-B receptor agonist and antispasmodic medication, has been found to reduce cravings but without a significant benefit towards preventing relapse or improving sleep. Zolpidem, a GABA-A receptor agonist and "Z-hypnotic" medication, has shown some efficacy in treating insomnia due to cannabis withdrawal, though there is a potential for misuse. Entacapone was well tolerated and decreased cannabis cravings in a trial on a small number of patients. Topiramate, an antiepileptic drug, has shown mixed results in adolescents, reducing the volume of cannabis consumption without significantly increasing abstinence, with somewhat poor tolerability. Gabapentin, an indirect GABA modulator, has shown some preliminary benefit for reducing cravings and cannabis use.

The agonist substitution approach is one that draws upon the analogy of the success of nicotine replacement therapy for nicotine addiction. Dronabinol, which is synthetic THC, has shown benefit in reducing cravings and other symptoms of withdrawal, though without preventing relapse or promoting abstinence. Combination therapy with dronabinol and the alpha 2 adrenergic receptor agonist lofexidine have shown mixed results, with possible benefits towards reducing withdrawal symptoms. However, overall, the combination of dronabinol and lofexidine is likely not effective for the treatment of cannabis use disorder. Nabilone, a synthetic THC analogue, has shown benefits in reducing symptoms of withdrawal such as difficulty sleeping, and decreased overall cannabis use. Despite its psychoactive effects, the slower onset of action and longer duration of action of nabilone make it less likely to be abused than cannabis itself, which makes nabilone a promising harm reduction strategy for the treatment of cannabis use disorder. The combination of nabilone and zolpidem has been shown to decrease sleep-related and mood-related symptoms of cannabis withdrawal, in addition to decreasing cannabis use. Nabiximols, a combined THC and cannabidiol (CBD) product that is formulated as an oral (buccal) spray, has been shown to improve withdrawal symptoms without improving abstinence rates. Oral CBD has not shown efficacy in reducing the signs or symptoms of cannabis use, and likely has no benefit in cannabis use withdrawal symptoms. The CB-1 receptor antagonist rimonabant has shown efficacy in reducing the effects of cannabis in users, but with a risk for serious psychiatric side effects.

Naltrexone, a mu opioid receptor antagonist, has shown mixed results for cannabis use disorder—both increasing the subjective effects of cannabis when given acutely, but potentially decreasing the overall use of cannabis with chronic administration. N-acetylcysteine (NAC) has shown some limited benefit in decreasing cannabis use in adolescents, though not with adults. Lithium, a mood stabilizer, has shown mixed results for treating symptoms of cannabis withdrawal, but is likely ineffective. Quetiapine, a second-generation antipsychotic, has been shown to treat cannabis withdrawal related insomnia and decreased appetite at the expense of exacerbating cravings. Oxytocin, a neuropeptide that the body produces, has shown some benefit in reducing the use of cannabis when administered intranasally in combination with motivational enhancement therapy sessions, though the treatment effect did not persist between sessions.

Finally, CB1 antagonists such as rimonabant have been tested for utility in CUD. These drugs are effective at blocking the subjective effects of cannabis intoxication as well as the somatic components. This is accomplished by preventing THC binding to the CB1 receptor, effectively eliminating the ability to get high. This is similar to how naloxone and naltrexone are used for opiates. CB1 antagonists may also aid in reducing cravings. Worries of psychological side effects that occur over prolonged exposure have led to the discontinuation of the development of many of these compounds, but several are currently entering clinical trials for the treatment of cannabis intoxication.

Over-the-counter sedating Antihistamines such as Doxylamine have sedating and anti-emetic effects and may provide short term relief but should only be used within advised dosages.

Barriers to treatment 
Research that looks at barriers to cannabis treatment frequently cites a lack of interest in treatment, lack of motivation and knowledge of treatment facilities, an overall lack of facilities, costs associated with treatment, difficulty meeting program eligibility criteria and transport difficulties.

Epidemiology
According to the 2022 National Survey on Drug Use and Health, cannabis is one of the most widely used drugs in the world. Research by the Pew Research Center from 2012 claims 42% of the US population have claimed to use cannabis at some point. According to the 2019 National Survey on Drug Use and Health, 46% of U.S. adults say they have ever used marijuana. An estimated 9% of those who use cannabis develop dependence. 

In the U.S., cannabis is the most commonly identified illicit substance used by people admitted to treatment facilities. Most of these people were referred there by the criminal justice system. Of admittees 16% either went on their own, or were referred by family or friends.

Of Australians aged 14 years and over 34.8% have used cannabis one or more times in their life.

In the European Union (data as available in 2018, information for individual countries was collected between 2012 and 2017), 26.3% of adults aged 15–64 used cannabis at least once in their lives, and 7.2% used cannabis in the last year. The highest prevalence of cannabis use among 15 to 64 years old in the EU was reported in France, with 41.4% having used cannabis at least once in their life, and 2.17% used cannabis daily or almost daily. Among young adults (15–34 years old), 14.1% used cannabis in the last year.

Among adolescents (15–16 years old) in a European school based study (ESPAD), 16% of students have used cannabis at least once in their life, and 7% (boys: 8%, girls: 5%) of students had used cannabis in the last 30 days.

Globally, 22.1 million people (0.3% of the worlds population) were estimated to have cannabis dependence.

Research 

Medications such as SSRI antidepressants, mixed action antidepressants, bupropion, buspirone and atomoxetine may not be helpful to treat cannabis use disorder, but the evidence is very weak and further research is required. THC preparations, gabapentin, oxytocin, and N-acetylcysteine also require more research to determine if they are effective as the evidence base is weak.

Heavy cannabis use has been associated with impaired cognitive functioning, however, its specific details are difficult to elucidate due to the potential use of additional substances of users, and lack of longitudinal studies.

See also 
 La Guardia Committee, the first in-depth study into the effects of cannabis.
 Medical cannabis
 Quitting smoking

References

External links 

Cannabis smoking
Substance dependence